Kalanikūpule (1760–1795) was the Mōī of Maui and King of Oahu. He was the last king to physically fight with Kamehameha I over the Hawaiian Islands. Kalanikūpule was the last of the longest line of aliʻi nui in the Hawaiian Islands. In Hawaiian his name means "the heavenly prayer of Kū".

Early life 
Kalanikūpule was the eldest son of Kahekili II and his wife Kauwahine. His father had gained control all of the Hawaiian Islands except the island of Hawaii. His father had overthrown the king of Oahu and had established his base at Waikīkī. Kamehameha declared war on Maui and fought Kalanikūpule at the Battle of Kepaniwai. Kalanikūpule, facing imminent defeat, fled over a narrow mountain pass along with his high chiefs, and they sailed to Oahu.  Kahekili began his war preparations. Kamehameha's troops returned to Hawaiʻi Island, and soon Kahekili was able to regain Maui and Molokaʻi back. In July 1794 Kahekili died.

Reign 
Following the death of his father, Kalanikūpule took Oahu while his uncle Kaeokulani gained control of Maui, Lānai, and Molokai. When his uncle decided to visit his wife's home on Kauai, he sailed from Maui by way of Oahu, taking his army with him. When his uncle reached Oahu he stopped at Waimanalo. Disputes — partly over inheritance of the Kingdom of Maui — arose between him and Kalanikūpule, resulting in war. Kalanikūpule was in a desperate situation.

At this time, three foreign ships arrived. Two of these vessels, the Jackal and the Prince Lee Boo were British sloops under the command of Captain William Brown and Captain Robert Gordon. The third vessel, the Lady Washington, was an American snow with Captain John Hendrick in command. These were not strangers in the islands as foreign trading vessels were frequent visitors to Hawaii. It was Captain Brown who was given credit for discovering the harbor of Honolulu and naming it Fair Haven. Jackal and Prince Lee Boo were the tenders to the ship Butterworth, and were the first Western vessels to enter Honolulu harbor.

Kalanikūpule asked Captain Brown for assistance to his army. The Captain decided to help him, as did the two mates of the Jackal and the Prince Lee Boo. These men aided Kalanikūpule’s force in what was later called the Battle of Kalauao. The muskets of the sailors drove Kaeo’s warriors into hills that overshadowed Honolulu. They finally retreated into a little ravine. Kaeo tried to escape, but Brown’s men and Kendrick’s men saw his ahu ula, his scarlet and yellow feather cloak, and fired at Kaeo from their boats in the harbor to show his position to Kalanikūpule’s men. The Oahu warriors killed Kaeo along with his wives and chiefs.

This was a successful move, and the battle ended with Kalanikūpule as the victor.  Captain Brown fired a salute to celebrate the victory. At least one gun was loaded with shot which pierced the side of the American ship Lady Washington, killing Captain Hendrick and several of his crew.

Encouraged by the victory over his uncle, Kalanikūpule decided to acquire the Jackal and the Prince Lee Boo and military hardware to aid in his attack on Kamehameha on the island of Hawai'i. Kalanikūpule killed Brown and Gordon and abducted the remainder of his crew.

Kalanikūpule's demise
Kalanikūpule planned an immediate attack on the island of Hawaii. The crews of the two ships were ordered to get the ships ready to sail. This was done. He, his wife, and their retinue then went on board and took possession of their new vessels. The two mates of the English ships decided that they, with their crews, would try to recapture the ships. This was a daring venture, but they succeeded. The natives were either killed or driven from the ships, with the exception of Kalanikūpule and his queen and their personal attendants. Near dawn, the ships were put out to sea. While still ashore, the king and queen were placed in a canoe and set afloat. The ships sailed on to the island of Hawaii, where the two mates secured supplies. They left a letter for John Young and Isaac Davis, informing to them of the situation on Oahu, and sailed at once for Canton.

Knowing his enemy's disadvantage, Kamehameha used his strong army and his fleet of canoes and small ships to conquer Maui, Lānai, and Molokai from Kalanikūpule's rule in 1794. Kamehameha's next target was the Kalanikūpule's base at Oahu. As Kamehameha prepared for war, one of his former allies, a chief named Kaʻiana, turned on him and joined forces with Kalanikūpule. Kamehameha's warriors and Kalanikūpule fought a great battle at the summit of Nuuanu Pali which is known as the Battle of Nuuanu. Following his defeat, Kalanikūpule hid in the mountains for several months before being captured and sacrificed to Kamehameha's war god, Kū-ka-ili-moku. His death brought the end of the Kingdom of Maui.

References 

1760 births
1795 deaths
Royalty of Maui
House of Kekaulike
House of Līloa
18th-century monarchs in Oceania